Mucrocetin is a snake venom platelet-agglutinating factor, that acts in a vWF-independent manner. It binds specifically to platelet GPIbalpha (GP1BA) to a distinct binding site from that of flavocetin-A. It is isolated from the venom of Taiwan habu (Protobothrops mucrosquamatus).

It is related to the C-type lectins.

References 

Vertebrate toxins